The 2010 Premiership Rugby Sevens Series, (known for sponsorship reasons as the 2010 J.P Morgan Asset Management Premiership Rugby 7s Series) was the inaugural Rugby Union 7-a-side competition for the twelve 2010–11 Aviva Premiership Clubs. It took place during the months of July and August, was sponsored by J.P Morgan Asset Management, and the final was held at the Recreation Ground on 6 August 2010.

Format
The twelve Premiership Clubs were split into three Groups – A, B and C – with each group playing on a consecutive Friday in July. Each team in the group played each other once, to the International Rugby Board Laws of the Game - 7s Variations. Based on the result, teams would receive:
4 points for a win
2 points for a draw
1 bonus point for a loss by seven points or less
1 bonus point for scoring four or more tries in a match
Following all the games, the winner and runner up in the group would progress to the final.  In the final, the 6 teams (3 Winners and 3 Runners up) are split into 2 pools. Again teams play each other once and points are awarded based on the result. Following the culmination of this stage the winners of each pool progress to the final, the winner of that game being declared the champions.

Group stage

Group A
Played on Friday 16 July 2010 at The Stoop, Twickenham.

Group B
Played on Friday 23 July 2010 at Welford Road, Leicester.

Group C
Played on Friday 30 July 2010 at Franklin's Gardens, Northampton.

Final
The final was held at The Recreation Ground, Bath on Friday 6 August 2010.

Pool A

Pool B

Final
Newcastle Falcons 7s and Saracens 7s won their respective pools and therefore played in the final of the 2010 Premiership Rugby Sevens Series.

 Saracens 7s won the 2010 Premiership Rugby Sevens Series.

References

Sevens
Premiership Rugby Sevens Series
English